Kuri Dolal is a town in Gujar Khan Tehsil, Punjab, Pakistan. Kuri Dolal is also the chief town of Union Council Kuri Dolal, which is an administrative subdivision of the Tehsil.

Towns and unions in the city district of Rawalpindi

 Noor Dolal
 Gumti
 Arazi Hasnaal
 Kuri Dolal
 Tapyali khurd     
 Saib
Faisal Colloney
Natha Dolal
 Ganja Mera
 Jahag
Kala Pida
 Karali
 Kund
 Dharayala
Mohra Gujran
 Jherian Arian
 Dhoke Maira

.

References 

Union councils of Gujar Khan Tehsil